Roman Wörndle (4 October 1913 – 2 February 1942) was a German alpine skier who competed in the 1936 Winter Olympics.

He was born in Partenkirchen, where he was member of the Skiclub Partenkirchen (SCP). In 1936 he finished fifth in the alpine skiing combined event.

He was killed in action during World War II.

References 

1913 births
1942 deaths
Olympic alpine skiers of Germany
Sportspeople from Garmisch-Partenkirchen
Alpine skiers at the 1936 Winter Olympics
German military personnel killed in World War II
People from the Kingdom of Bavaria
Gebirgsjäger of World War II
German male alpine skiers